Jim Primavera (born ) is a Canadian wheelchair curler.

Teams

References

External links 

Living people
1962 births
Canadian male curlers
Canadian wheelchair curlers
Canadian wheelchair curling champions